The Sopot International Song Festival or Sopot Festival (later called Sopot Music Festival Grand Prix, Sopot Top of the Top Festival from 2012–13 and Polsat Sopot Festival in 2014) is an annual international song contest held in Sopot, Poland. It is the biggest Polish music festival altogether with the National Festival of Polish Song in Opole, and one of the biggest song contests in Europe.

The contest was organised and transmitted live by the public Polish Television (TVP) between 1994 and 2004. The following year, the concert was broadcast by the private media station TVN for the first time and remained on TVN until 2009. From 2012 to 2014, the concert was broadcast and organised by Polsat. It was later cancelled by the broadcaster. The 2015 festival was not televised, however it returned in 2017 on TVN.

History

The first Sopot festival was initiated and organised in 1961 by Władysław Szpilman, assisted by Szymon Zakrzewski from Polish Artists Management (PAGART). The first three editions were held in the Gdansk Shipyard hall (1961–1963), after which the festival moved to the Forest Opera. The main prize has been Amber Nightingale through most of its history.

Between 1977 and 1980 it was replaced by the Intervision Song Contest, which was still held in Sopot. Unlike the Eurovision Song Contest, the Sopot International Music Festival often changed its formulas to pick a winner and offered many different contests for its participants. For example, at the 4th Intervision Song Festival (held in Sopot August 20–23, 1980) two competitions were effective: one for artists representing television companies, the other for those representing record companies. In the first the jury considered the artistic merits of the songs entered; while in the second, it judged the performers' interpretation."

The festival has always been open to non-European acts, and countries like Cuba, Dominican Republic, Mongolia, New Zealand, Nigeria, Peru, South Africa and many others have been represented in this event.

The contest lost popularity in Poland and abroad in the 1980s, declining further during the 1990s, and the rather unconvincing organisations by TVP made the authorities of Sopot give the organization of the 2005 Sopot International Song Festival to a private TV channel, TVN.

Since 1999, there was no contest. TVP chose to invite well-known artists instead, featuring the likes of Whitney Houston, Tina Turner, The Corrs, Lionel Richie, UB40, Ricky Martin and Simply Red to perform. In 2005, TVN brought the international competition back, taking over from TVP, and in 2006 invited Elton John and Katie Melua. The Sopot International Song Festival is usually considered bigger than the Benidorm International Song Festival because of its ability to attract star performers.

In 2010 and 2011, the festival did not take place due to renovation of the Forest Opera. Since 2012, it is called Sopot Top Of The Top Festival and is broadcast annually by Polsat. In 2014, the name was changed to Polsat Sopot Festival. In 2015, Polsat decided not to organize the festival. However, the city authorities decided to organize a one-day festival in Sopot this year, but without a television broadcast.

In 2016, the concert did not take place due to the lack of a television partner, which initially was to be TVP. After a year of break, the decision was made to restore the festival. Since 2017, it has been organized and broadcast by TVN again.

The festival also provided opportunity to listen to international stars. In the past, it featured Charles Aznavour, Boney M, Gloria Gaynor, Johnny Cash, and more recently: Chuck Berry, Vanessa Mae, Annie Lennox, Belinda Carlisle, Vaya Con Dios, Chris Rea, Tanita Tikaram, La Toya Jackson, Kajagoogoo and Goran Bregovic, Anastacia.

Winners by year

This list includes only winners of the most prestigious contests within the Sopot Music Festival. Sometimes one contest has overshadowed another with time. Grand Prix de disque was the most prestigious award between 1974 and 1976 and the Intervision Song Contest during 1977–80. Since the 1980s, the main prize of the festival is the Amber Nightingale award.

The festival has also given prizes for Best Interpretation in the 1960s, and Winner Of The Polish Day on and off from the 1960s to the 1980s.

Winners by country

*More than one winner at that year.

See also 

 ABU Song Festivals
 AfriMusic Song Contest
 Bundesvision Song Contest
 Cân i Gymru
 Caribbean Song Festival
 Eurovision Choir
 Eurovision Dance Contest
 Eurovision Song Contest
 Eurovision Young Dancers
 Eurovision Young Musicians
 Intervision Song Contest
 Junior Eurovision Song Contest
 OGAE
 OGAE Second Chance Contest
 OGAE Video Contest
 Sanremo Music Festival
 Turkvision Song Contest

References

External links

 Sopot Festival website 
 The complete list of all participants and places till 2009 

 
Sopot
Music festivals in Poland
Music competitions in Poland
Song contests
Music festivals established in 1961
1961 establishments in Poland
Tourist attractions in Pomeranian Voivodeship
Polish television shows
Annual events in Poland